Cop Rock is an American police procedural musical television series created by Steven Bochco and William M. Finkelstein for the American Broadcasting Company. It premiered on September 26, 1990, and broadcast eleven episodes before concluding on December 26. It was both a critical and commercial failure when it originally aired.

Premise
Following the Los Angeles Police Department, Cop Rock features an ensemble cast of police officers and detectives as they solve crimes across the city, with the series mixing musical and choreography throughout storylines and to introduce new characters. In its main storyline, Captain John Hollander (Larry Joshua) investigates the involvement of Detective Vincent LaRusso (Peter Onorati) in the execution of murder suspect Tyrone Weeks (Art Kimbro). Subplots include Detective Ralph Ruskin's (Ron McLarty) growing jealousy of his wife Officer Vicki Quinn (Anne Bobby), and her friendship with Officer Andy Campo (David Gianopoulos); Quinn helping drug addict Patricia Spence (Kathleen Wilhoite) recover her baby which Spence had sold for $200; and the relationship between corrupt Mayor Louise Plank (Barbara Bosson) and Chief Roger Kendrick (Ronny Cox).

Cast

Main

 Anne Bobby as Officer Vicki Quinn
 Barbara Bosson as Mayor Louise Plank
 David Gianopoulos as Officer Andy Campo
 Larry Joshua as Captain John Hollander
 James McDaniel as Officer Franklin Rose
 Ron McLarty as Detective Ralph Ruskin
 Mick Murray as Detective Joseph Gaines
 Peter Onorati as Detective Vincent LaRusso
 Ronny Cox as Chief Roger Kendrick
 Vondie Curtis-Hall as Commander Warren Osborne
 Paul McCrane as Detective Bob McIntire

Recurring
 William Thomas Jr. as Detective William Donald Potts
 Kathleen Wilhoite as Patricia Spence
 Teri Austin as Trish Vaughn
 Dennis Lipscomb as Sidney Weitz
 Jeffrey Alan Chandler as Ray Rodbart
 CCH Pounder as Willa Phelan

Episodes

Production

Development

In the early 1980s, a Broadway producer offered Steven Bochco a proposal to convert his series Hill Street Blues into a musical. As the plan was not practical, the proposal was declined, but Bochco kept the idea in mind and thought about doing the opposite instead, converting a Broadway show into a police procedural television series. In 1987, the American Broadcasting Company (ABC) gave Bochco a production commitment for ten of his future shows, and wanting to experiment, he developed Cop Rock as a "bold and adventurous" idea. The head of ABC Entertainment at the time, Bob Iger, was one of the only people willing to give him a chance, allowing the creation of the series. On the opportunity, James McDaniel stated that, "the media said it was impossible and that it was ridiculous, but nothing's impossible and ridiculous if you have the right pieces in place."

Casting
Over 200 people auditioned for Cop Rock; Peter Onorati, who portrays Detective Vincent LaRusso, was introduced to the series by his wife after she talked with Howard McGillin, who had also auditioned. Jokingly stating that he had experience singing at weddings, Onorati's agent, Kay Liberman, set up an audition, where Onorati performed Fats Domino's "Blue Monday".

One of the only actors with singing experience, Teri Austin graduated with a Bachelor of Fine Arts and performed "Lover Man" and "Breaking Up Is Hard to Do" at her audition. Kathleen Wilhoite, who portrays Patricia Spence, had a record deal at the time, and decided to audition with "Easy to Be Hard", finding her casting as a "good gig for me, because singing is kind of my thing". McDaniel, on the other hand, turned down an offer to join the series but changed his mind after finding out it was created by Bochco, who he had worked with on the last season of Hill Street Blues.

Mick Murray was searching for an acting job in New York and was going through multiple pilots from ABC before hearing about Cop Rock and Bochco's involvement. At his audition, the casting director was Alexa Fogel, who was not of fan of his following a failed audition for the film Young Guns. As a result, Murray decided to perform a cappella by Terence Trent D'Arby, which Fogel responded to with "the warmest smile". At night, Murray received a phone call from his agent and was told that the production crew had expanded a small role for him so he could join as a series regular.

Larry Joshua brought his own guitar to his audition and performed "When She Wants Good Lovin'" and "Then You Can Tell Me Goodbye". During this time, David Gianopoulos heard about the series after running into Joshua near 42nd Street. Revealing to his agent that he had been secretly singing in several bands for over six years, Gianopoulos auditioned with Ben E. King's "Stand by Me" at Lincoln Center, where several other cast members also had their auditions. Originally, Gianopoulos had auditioned for the role of LaRusso before being told by Bochco to audition for the role of Officer Andy Campo. The following day, he performed Bruce Springsteen's "Hungry Heart" and received the part.

Ronny Cox was told by pilot director Gregory Hoblit that he would get the role of Chief Roger Kendrick whether or not he could sing. Broadway performer Anne Bobby, however, had to audition, doing so on a Saturday where she said she saw her friend Jane Krakowski. Furthermore, Paul McCrane was told by Hoblit and Bochco that they did not have a part for him at the moment and reassured him that they would write a new character once the show entered production; McCrane was later cast as Detective Bob McIntire.

Reception
On review aggregator Rotten Tomatoes, the series holds an approval rating of 53% based on 17 reviews, with an average rating of 5.33/10. The website's critical consensus states, "Cop Rock'''s ambition to innovate the police procedural is admirable, but the contrast of grit and glam proves too jarring with unmemorable music throwing the series' more promising dramatic beats askew." On Metacritic, it has a weighted average score of 61 out of 100, based on 15 critics, indicating "generally favorable reviews".

The show was a critical and commercial failure and was canceled by ABC after 11 episodes. The combination of a fusion of musical performances with serious police drama and dark humor with its high-powered production talent, made it infamous as one of the biggest television failures of the 1990s. TV Guide Magazine ranked it #8 on its List of the 50 Worst TV Shows of All Time list in 2002 and dubbed it "the single most bizarre TV musical of all time".

Despite an overwhelmingly negative reception and short run, the series has been rebroadcast in later years, with VH1 and A&E Network airing it on separate occasions later in the 1990s, and Trio in the 2000s.

Home media
On May 17, 2016, Shout! Factory released the complete series on DVD in Region 1.

Awards and nominations

International broadcasts
In the United Kingdom, Cop Rock was televised on BBC1 and premiered on Monday 30 September 1991. The show premiered on Australian television via the Ten Network on Thursday 23 January 1992 at 11:00 PM.

See also
 That's Life - An hour-long 1968 musical comedy series with Broadway-style staging and musical numbers.
 Hull High – A teen comedy television series with musical segments that debuted (and was canceled) in 1990.
 Viva Laughlin – A 2007 television drama with musical segments. The show was canceled after just two airings due to poor ratings.
 Crazy Ex-Girlfriend – A romantic musical comedy-drama series that premiered on October 12, 2015 and ran for four seasons.
 Zoey's Extraordinary Playlist'' – A romantic musical comedy drama that premiered on January 7, 2020.

References

External links
 

1990 American television series debuts
1990 American television series endings
1990s American crime drama television series
1990s American music television series
1990s American police procedural television series
American Broadcasting Company original programming
English-language television shows
Fictional portrayals of the Los Angeles Police Department
Primetime Emmy Award-winning television series
Television shows scored by Randy Newman
Television series by 20th Century Fox Television
Television series created by Steven Bochco
Television shows set in Los Angeles